The 1995 NCAA Division I Men's Soccer Tournament was the 36th organized men's college soccer tournament by the National Collegiate Athletic Association, to determine the top college soccer team in the United States. The Wisconsin Badgers won their first national title by defeating the Duke Blue Devils in the championship game, 2–0. The semifinals, on December 8, 1995, and the final match, on December 10, 1995, were played in Richmond, Virginia at Richmond Stadium. All first, second and third round matches were played at the home field of the higher seeded team.

National Seeds

Play in rounds

Early rounds

Final

References

NCAA Division I Men's Soccer Tournament seasons
NCAA Division I Men's
NCAA Division I Men's Soccer Tournament
NCAA Division I Men's Soccer Tournament